was a Japanese visual kei rock band formed in 2002. Their concept was "Occult Romance". After going major, they had several top 40 singles before disbanding in 2011.

History

2002-2003
Vidoll was begun by Rame and formed in 2002. After signing to Matina, they released two complementary EPs, Face Mayura and Face Pisaroto, which sold out the same day they were released. The combined artwork from the covers of both EPs form a single image. While on Matina, Vidoll also released their first single, "Occult Proposal", starting a tradition of Christmas Day single releases, and contributed to several compilation CDs.

After Matina shut down, the label founder, Kisaki, formed Under Code Production March 1, 2003. The first release from the new label was a pair of singles which were still numbered as a Matina release.  Some of the songs were combined onto the EP "If...Yakubutsu Ranyou Bokumetsu Campaign" in a larger edition.  The release was followed by the band's first national tour in Japan, as well as their first solo live show. The band then released their first DVD, Doll Mansion 209 Goushitsu, showcasing their music videos. Later that year guitarist Ayano left the band for musical differences. Hide was recruited as the new guitarist in September.  The band started a 10 date tour with Gazette in October and both bands shared the cover of Cure magazine in November.  This tour solidified Vidoll's place in the Visual Kei scene, and their Christmas single "Hitokiri no Kurixxxxsu" hit number 79 on the Oricon Weekly Singles Chart.

2004 
On March 10, the single "Wagahai wa, Korosuke Nari..." was released and reached number 4 on the Oricon Independent Chart.  After the first press of 10,000 was sold out, a second pressing of 10,000 was released later in the year.  On April 28, the French label Mabell released Bijinkei, an 11 track compilation album of Vidoll songs for the European market. In May, Vidoll's vocalist Jui performed in France with Kisaki Project.  Vidoll was one of five bands to be selected for "Expect Rush", a yearly publication by Shoxx that catalogs independent visual kei artists.  On June 30 both the single "Ningyo" and the concert DVD Gyaku went on sale, and "Ningyo" reached third place on the Oricon Independent Chart.

The tour final "Ningyou Enzetsu" was held on September 11 and was the final stop in their one-man tour.  A special copy of Romanesque Gothic was released with a special (all black) cover.  The First press (red cover) went on sale September 29, along with the second press of Wagahai wa, Korosuke Nari...".  A live DVD of the event went on sale November 17, "Ningyou Enzetsu 2004.9.11 Liquidroom Ebisu".  Toward the end of the year several more one-man performances were held.  On December 15 two mini-albums and a DVD were released. Mukashi Natsukashi Ningyoushuu: Sono Ichi and Mukashi Natsukashi Ningyoushuu: Sono Ni were new recordings of songs from previously sold out releases.  The DVD Ningyou Kai PV contained two Music Videos, one for "Ningyo" and "F-Stein to M".

2005 
On January 1, Vidoll's official fan club "Ningyou Kan" began.  In March Vidoll had a One-man tour only for members of their fan club, for a total of 8 shows.

The Live DVD "Mijin Kakumei~Saishuu Kaukumei Yokokubi 1229~ was released, with over 3 hours of live footage.  A special single and Music video (Remind Story) was released in two versions, the Osaka version and Tokyo version on April 22 and 26th, sold at two of their one-man shows.  

On June 8, Mukashi Natsukashi Soushuuhen + Omake Tsuki was released.  This is a re-release of the songs on the two "Mukashi Natsukashi Ningyoushuu" mini-albums, combined into one album, as the previous albums had quickly sold out all 10,000 copies.  The "extra" was a music video on a DVD.  On July 13 another Live DVD, from their "Roman Kokuhaku" live was released.

On April 26, at the Roman Kokuhaku one-man live, Jui announced that members Hide and Yukine were leaving Vidoll at the end of June. Messages from each band member were quickly posted on Vidoll's official website confirming the band was staying together.  Hide's message stated that though he loved the band, the members, and the fans, the hectic tour schedule was affecting his health.  Yukine left for personal reasons.

The band took one last tour "Toumeihanzai" before Hide and Yukine left on 6.26.  This was a fan club only tour.  The last concert with all the members was recorded and later released as a set of two DVDs through the fan club.

On June 13, two new members: Shun (of CalorZe and Gossip) and Gil (Lilith), joined Vidoll.
Kisaki, the executive manager of Vidoll's label, Under Code Productions, announced that three of the label's bands, including Vidoll, would be "graduating" from the label.  They signed to Sword Records.

2007-2011 

During Memorial Day weekend, spring of 2007, Vidoll had their US premier at J-rock Revolution in Los Angeles, California.  Yoshiki, of X Japan fame, hosted the event, and several other visual kei bands also had their US debut during the course of both nights.

On January 7, 2008, Megacon posted information on their official website confirming that Vidoll will be present at Megacon (March 7–9, 2008) for 2 autograph signings, 2 photo sessions, and a Q & A.  Vidoll will release a DVD of their live show held at C.C. Lemon Hall on December 2, 2007. The two-hour-long DVD from Sword Records will go on sale for 4500 yen on March 5.

Vidoll went major with the release of "Puzzle Ring".
Jui announced on his official blog that, immediately following the final of the ReSet tour (September 18, 2010), Vidoll will be taking a break for an undisclosed amount of time. He said that, due to a thrombus in his throat, he will be undergoing surgery and recovering.

On January 18, 2011, Vidoll announced their disbandment due to musical differences and non-music professional interests. Jui also announced he was preparing a solo album.

Members
 – Vocals
 – Guitar
 – Guitar
 – Bass guitar
 – Drum

Former members
Ayano – Guitar (2002–2003)
Yukine - Guitar (Left on June 26, 2005)
Hide - Guitar (2003–2005)

Discography

Albums and EPs
Face Pisaroto (July 21, 2002)
Face Mayura (July 21, 2002)
If...Yakubutsu Ranyou Bokumetsu Campaign (April 29, 2003)
Bijinkei (July 29, 2004)Romanesque Gothic (September 11, 2004) Oricon Singles Weekly Ranking Position: 103Mukashi Natsukashi Ningyoushu Sono Ichi (December 15, 2004) Oricon Singles Weekly Ranking Position: 110Mukashi Natsukashi Ningyoushu Sono Ni (December 15, 2004) Oricon Singles Weekly Ranking Position: 115Mukashi Natsukashi Soushuuhen Omake Tsuki (June 8, 2005)Deathmate (January 1, 2006) Oricon Singles Weekly Ranking Position: 83V.I.D (November 22, 2006) Oricon Singles Weekly Ranking Position: 56Proposal -Sotsugyou Kokuhaku-(February 28, 2007) Oricon Singles Weekly Ranking Position: 84Bastard (November 21, 2007) Oricon Singles Weekly Ranking Position: 69 Oricon Independent Chart Ranking: 4Esoteric Romance (March 25, 2009) Oricon Singles Weekly Ranking Position: 44Monad (February 10, 2010) Oricon Singles Weekly Ranking Position: 44Best'' (January 19, 2011) Oricon Singles Weekly Ranking Position: 58

Singles
Occult Proposal (December 12, 2002)
If... Rebotomin (Y LV25 25) 475 mg (March 14, 2003)
If... Torikabuto (Shikibetsu Code Nashi) 120 mg (March 14, 2003)
Kana na no Chikai Mimi (April 26, 2003) Contained a band message and one live song
Genjou Teki ni Kiken na Title no Tame Ima wa Dekimasen... (July 21, 2003)
Ishoku Doumei (August 1, 2003) Calimero/Vidoll CD, each with one song and one cover.
Boku, Shimobe (December 19, 2003)
Hitokiri no Kurixxxxsu (December 12, 2003) Oricon Singles Weekly Ranking Position: 79
Wagahai wa, Korosuke Nari... (1st Press March 10, 2004) (2nd Press September 29, 2004) Oricon Independent Chart Ranking: 4
Kichigai TV (March 19, 2004)
Giza-Giza Heart no Komoriuta (March 19, 2004)
Boku, White Day mo Hitorikiri (March 29, 2004)
Ningyo (June 30, 2004) Oricon Independent Chart Ranking: 3
Hiiragi no Sou (December 25, 2004)
Homo-Crash-Trap@ (December 29, 2004)
Remind Story (April 22, 2005)
Shutdown (September 28, 2005) Oricon Singles Weekly Ranking Position: 33
Chocoripeyes (October 26, 2005) Oricon Singles Weekly Ranking Position: 33
SinAI～右手のカッターと 左手のドラッグと薬指の深い愛と～ (May 24, 2006, 3 Types) Oricon Singles Weekly Ranking Position: 43
Nectar (August 2, 2006)
Junengo no Kyo Koko de . . . (March 28, 2007)
Message Card (March 28, 2007)
Innocent Teens (June 13, 2007) Oricon Singles Weekly Ranking Position: 39
Cloud (July 18, 2007)
Blue star (July 2, 2008) Oricon Singles Weekly Ranking Position: 21 Oricon Independent Chart Ranking: 2
Maimu (December 10, 2008) Oricon Singles Weekly Ranking Position: 27
Puzzle Ring (February 18, 2009) Oricon Singles Weekly Ranking Position: 33
Focus (July 8, 2009) Oricon Singles Weekly Ranking Position: 22
Eve (December 2, 2009) Oricon Singles Weekly Ranking Position: 30
Crescent gazer (September 15, 2010)

DVDs
Doll Mansion 209 Goushitsu (May 30, 2003)
Shigatsu Nijuuroku Nichi, Hatsutaiken (October 1, 2003)
Gyaku-Tsutsumotase (June 30, 2004)
Ningyou Enzetsu-2004.9.11 Liquid Room Ebisu- (November 17, 2004)
Ningyoukai PV (December 15, 2004)
Bijinkakumei~Saishuu Yokokubi 1229~ (March 16, 2005)
Daini me Zenkoku Ningyougeki -Rurou- FINAL «Rouman Kokuhaku» 2005.4.26 Nihon Seinenkan (April 26, 2005)
3℃StormTV-suna arashi housou-2006.8.29 SHIBUYA-AX(November 22, 2006)
V.I.D seat for "Lastlovers" 2006.12.29 Shibuya Kokaido (February 28, 2007)
[Flashback](February 28, 2007)
Genei Bijin Kan - 2006.11.25 SHIBUYA O-EAST(August 29, 2007)
~The game of buster~ 2007.12.02 C.C.Lemon HALL(March 5, 2008)
Relieve Your Blue Scar 2008.8.21 SHIBUYA-AX (December 10, 2008)

References

External links
Vidoll Official Site
Rame's Blog
Jui's blog
Shun's blog
Gil's blog

Japanese rock music groups
Gan-Shin artists
Visual kei musical groups
Musical groups from Osaka